Fortunatus Hueber (21 November 1639, in Neustadt an der Donau – 12 February 1706, in Munich) was a West German Franciscan historian and theologian.

Life

He entered the Bavarian province of the Franciscan Reformati on 5 November 1654. He was general lector in theology; cathedral preacher in Freising from 1670 to 1676; then in 1677 Provincial of Bavaria.

In 1679 he was definitor-general and chronologist of the order in Germany, and in 1698 was proclaimed ''scriptor ordinis. He was also confessor to the convent of the Poor Clares at Munich, called St. Jacob on the Anger.

As commissary of the general of the order in 1675 and 1701 he visited the Bohemian province, and in 1695 the province of St. Salvator in Hungary. The Elector of Cologne appointed Hueber as his theologian.

Works
He left over twenty works. The "Menologium Franciscanum" (Munich, 1698), lives of the beatified and saints of the Franciscan order, is arranged according to months and days. He also published a smaller work in German on the same subject, under the title "Stammenbuch ... und jährliches Gedächtniss aller Heiligen ... aus denen dreyen Ordens-Ständen ... S. Francisci" (Munich, 1693).

His "Dreyfache Chronickh von dem dreyfachen Orden ... S. Francisci, so weith er sich in Ober- und Nider-Deutschland erstrecket" (Munich, 1686) is a source for the history of the Franciscans in Germany.

Amongst his other works are:

"Libellus Thesium de mirabilibus operibus Domini" (Munich, 1665);
"Homo primus et secundus in mundum prolatus" (Munich, 1670);
"Leben des hl. Petrus von Alcantara" (Munich, 1670);
"Seraphische Schule des hl. P. von Alc." (Munich, 1670);
"Ornithologia per discursus praedicabiles exhibita" (Munich, 1678), in fol.

Written in the same style, but not printed, were:

his spiritual discourses, "Zoologia moralis", and "Ichthyologia moralis", each in two vols.;
"Candor lucis aeternæ seu Vita S. Antonii de Padua" (Munich, 1670);
"Sanctuarium Prælatorum ... pro visitationibus" (Munich, 1684).

"Quodlibetum Angelico-Historicum" (Augsburg, 1697), published in Latin and German, is a contribution dealing with the history of the cult of the angels.

References

Attribution
 The entry cites:
GREIDERER, Germania Franciscana, II (Innsbruck, 1789), 421 sqq.;
MINGES, Geschichte der Franziskaner in Bayern (Munich, 1896), 146 sqq.

1639 births
1706 deaths
People from Kelheim (district)
German Friars Minor
17th-century German Catholic theologians
German male non-fiction writers
17th-century German writers
17th-century German male writers